Mary Mgonja, is a Tanzanian agricultural scientist and plant breeder, who works as the director for technology and communication at Namburi Agricultural Company Limited, a private Tanzanian agricultural enterprise.

Background and education
Mgonja was born in Tanzania, where she grew up and attended school, prior to enrolling in university. She holds a Doctor of Philosophy in plant breeding, and plant genetics, jointly obtained from the University of Ibadan and from the International Institute of Tropical Agriculture, also located in Ibadan.

Work experience
In the past, Mgonja has served as principal scientist on the improvement of dryland cereals, at the International Crops Research Institute for the Semi-Arid Tropics, based in Patancheru, Hyderabad, Telangana, India. She also represented Tanzania in crop networks in the Southern African Development Community (SADC) and in the East African Community (EAC). Monja served as the country director of the Alliance for a Green Revolution in Africa (AGRA), an organisation that is supported by the Bill and Melinda Gates Foundation and the Rockefeller Foundation and aims to improve agricultural output and products by supporting local farmers and farm workers. In her capacity as country director, Mgonja advocated for increased adoption of technology in agriculture to boost output, produce surplus products for the market and increase food security.

Other considerations
Mgonja is a member of the ten-person governing board of the Africa Seeds Organization, an inter-government agency within the African Union, which is responsible for implementing the African Seed and Biotechnology Programme.

Mary Won a competitive proposal on Challenge Program for Water and Food (CPWF) for approximately 1.8m US$ as CPWF Project no 1. Can be viewed on the website www.waterforfood.orgapproved proposals

Mary Mgonja was Part of a winning team for the project Africa Bio-fortified Sorghum funded by the Bill and Melinda Gates Foundation.  Africa Harvest Biotechnology Foundation International led the development of the project in collaboration with scientists each from Pioneer/DuPont, University of Missouri, ICRISAT among others  

Mary Mgonja has expert skills in Project proposal formulation, submission and soliciting for funds from e.g.  the Tanzania Breweries Ltd, International Atomic Energy Agency, Sasakawa Global 2000 and the World Bank, and the  Japanese Food Aid Counterpart Fund.

Projects like Sorghum and Millet Improvement Network Coordinator-SMINET for Southern Africa Development Cooperation (SADC)

Also a Founder and chairperson of the Tanzania Association for Professional Women in Agriculture and Environment (TAPWAE)

Mary Mgonja is Research network steering committee member (Maize and Wheat Research Network (MWIRNET) and Eastern and Central Africa Maize and Wheat (ECAMAW) network

Also conducted National coordination for research on wheat and barley, Member to the Tanzania national variety release and registration committee

See also

References

External links
About Namburi Agriculture Company Limited

Living people
Year of birth missing (living people)
Tanzanian women
Tanzanian scientists
Tanzanian women scientists
University of Ibadan alumni
People from Kilimanjaro Region